Bhai: Vyakti Ki Valli  is a Marathi film released in 2019. The movie is directed by Mahesh Manjrekar. The lead role of Pu La Deshpande is played by Sagar Deshmukh.

Plot
The film is biography on the famous writer Purushottam Laxman Deshpande. The details about his life are also taken from the book "Aaahe manohar tari" written by his wife Sunita Deshpande. The film is been created into two parts looking at the work Pu La Deshpande did. The 1st half was released on 4 January 2019, all over India. The 2nd half was released on 8 February 2019. The film is released in Marathi.

The film casts more than 80 important characters.

Cast
 Sagar Deshmukh / Saksham Kulkarni / Vijay Kenkre – Pu La Deshpande
 Mrunmayee Deshpande
 Iravati Harshe/Shubhangi Damle – Sunita Deshpande
 Satish Alekar
 Neena Kulkarni
 Mahesh Manjrekar
 Sachin Khedekar
 Vidhyadhar Joshi
 Sunil Barve – Dr Jabbar Patel
 Sagar Karande
 Swanand kirkire – Kumar Gandharv
 Ajay Purkar – Bhimsen Joshi

Crew
 Director – Mahesh Manjrekar
 Music – Ajit Parab
 Screen play – Ganesh Matkari
 Cinematographer – Karan B. Rawat
 Dialogue writer – Ratnakar Matkari
 Art director – Prashant Rane
 Background – Sameer Mhatre
 Editor – Abhijit Deshpande, Sourabh Prabhudesai

Reception
The movie was criticized for taking unnecessary cinematic liberty, defaming many well known, well respected, and prominent personalities along with Pu La himself; and distortion of facts from the descriptions in books by Pu La himself and Sunitabai's book "Aahe Manohar Tari."

See also
 Pu La Deshpande

References 

2019 films
2010s Marathi-language films
Films directed by Mahesh Manjrekar